Samuel Webster may refer to:

 Samuel R. Webster (1854–?), member of the Wisconsin State Assembly
 Samuel Webster (1813–1872), founder of Webster's Brewery
 Samuel Houston Webster, a character in the Honorverse
 Samuel C. Webster, Speaker of the New Hampshire House of Representatives, circa 1830